Don't Be a Stranger is the eleventh solo studio album by the singer-songwriter Mark Eitzel. It was released in October 2012 on Merge Records and produced by Sheldon Gomberg.

Track listing

References

2012 albums
Mark Eitzel albums
Merge Records albums